The Invesco QQQ Championship is a professional golf tournament on the PGA Tour Champions, played at Sherwood Country Club in Lake Sherwood, California. The inaugural edition in October 2016 featured a 72-player field competing for a $2 million purse, and was a no-cut 54-hole event.

Winners

References

External links
Coverage on the PGA Tour Champions' official site

PGA Tour Champions events
Golf in California
Sports in Ventura County, California
Recurring sporting events established in 2016
2016 establishments in California